Simone Lia  is an English cartoonist and author.

Early life and education
Born to Maltese parents, Lia grew up in Haverhill, Suffolk.

She studied art in Ipswich, illustration at the University of Brighton, and did an MA in communication in art and design at the Royal College of Art.

Works
She has created a number of children's books including Billy Bean's Dream, Follow the Line and Little Giant; and comics such as Golden Lions and Monkey and Spoon.

Her graphic novel Fluffy appeared in four self-published parts before being collected in one volume by Jonathan Cape in 2007.
Fluffy is a baby rabbit who is being looked after by an anxious, single man called Michael Pulcino. Michael tries to make it clear to Fluffy that he is not his daddy, but Fluffy appears to be in denial.

She is also noted for her work with Tom Gauld, whom she met at the Royal College of Art. Together they self-published the comics First and Second, under their Cabanon Press. The two volumes were then published together by Bloomsbury Publishing in 2003, as Both.

She has drawn Sausage and Carrots for The DFC and Lucie for The Phoenix.

Lia also contributes The Simone Lia Cartoon for the New Review magazine of The Observer.

Personal life
She is married to Tim, with whom she has a daughter Anjès (born around 2017). Lia is a practising Christian.

Bibliography
 The Secret Time Machine and the Gherkin Switcheroo (Candlewick Press, 2020) 
 They Didn't Teach THIS in Worm School! (Walker Books, 2017) 
 Please God, Find Me a Husband! (Jonathan Cape, 2012) 
 Fluffy (Jonathan Cape, 2009) 
 Little Giant (Gullane Children's Books, 2004) 
 Both (with Tom Gauld, Bloomsbury, 2003)
 Follow the Line (Mammoth, 2002) 
 Billy Bean's Dream (Gullane Children's Books, 2000) 
 Red's Great Chase (Egmont Books, 2000)

References

External links

Cabanon Press homepage
Bloomsbury.com entry

Living people
British comics artists
British comics writers
British female comics artists
Female comics writers
English children's writers
21st-century English novelists
21st-century English women writers
Year of birth missing (living people)